The 2013 Copa do Nordeste was a football competition held in the Brazilian Northeast, counting as the 10th edition in the history of the Copa do Nordeste. It was played from January 19, with its final on 10 and 17 March, featuring 16 clubs, with Bahia and Pernambuco having three berths each and Ceará, Rio Grande do Norte and Sergipe, Alagoas and Paraíba having two each.

Transmission 
 Rede Globo – only for the northeast region of Brazil
 TV Esporte Interativo – all games for all Brazil

Teams 
The clubs were separated into pots according to their ranking in the ranking of CBF.

Group stage

Group A

Group B

Group C

Group D

Knockout stages

Quarterfinals

Semi-finals

Finals

References

External links
 CBF.com 

Copa do Nordeste
2013
Copa do Nordeste